This is a list of seasons of Västerås-based Swedish ice hockey team VIK Västerås HK, which previously has competed as VIK Hockey Ungdom and Västerås IK.

References

Vas